Cuno is both a given name and a surname. Notable people with the name include:

Given name:
Cuno Amiet (1868–1961), Swiss artist
Cuno Hoffmeister (1892–1968), German astronomer
Cuno of Praeneste (died 1122), German cardinal
Cuno Pümpin (born 1939), Swiss economist
Cuno Tarfusser (born 1954), Italian judge
Cuno von Uechtritz-Steinkirch (1856–1908), German sculptor

Surname:
James Cuno (born 1951), American art historian and curator
Kurt Cuno (1896–1961), German Wehrmacht general
Wilhelm Cuno (1876–1933), German businessman, politician and chancellor of Germany (1922–1923)

See also
4183 Cuno, an asteroid
Kuno (disambiguation)